Hunger Hill is a settlement and unparished area about 12 miles from Manchester, in the Bolton district, in the county of Greater Manchester, England. In 2020 it had an estimated population of 1317.

History 
In the 1800s William Hulton took ownership of Hulton Park.

On the 1st August 1829 the first section of the Bolton to Leigh Railway Line opened, William and his Wife Mrs Maria Hulton travelled from Pendlebury Fold to Daubhill.

In 1840 Hulton Brick Works was established at Pendlebury fold, this site is now Hansons Concrete

On the 22nd 23rd, 24th, and 25 August 1934 Edward Rushton & Kenyon auctioned Hulton Brickworks as an additional item to the Pretoria Pit.

An image from the Bolton News shows a photo of the junction of Lock Lane and Wigan Road. It shows how the old cobbled road looked in 1951 before the motor way was built.

Until 1974 Hunger Hill was part of Westhoughton Urban District, in 1985 a parish called Westhoughton was formed that didn't cover Hunger Hill and Over Hulton.

Etomology
It is uncertain how the settlement came to be named as it is, though there have been several suggestions where the name originated from. An explanation offered during the late 1940s suggested that the name was originally "Hanger Hill", with hanger being an old English term meaning "a wood on the side of a steep hill", relating to the trees that were present in the area. However, in early 2002, this was disputed by a long-term resident, who expressed belief that the name originated from being somewhere where livestock "went hungry" due to inadequate pasture. An editor for The Bolton News tried to verify the statement by the resident, but was unable to do so, believing the explanation offered in the 1940s to be more credible.

References

External links 

Villages in Greater Manchester
Unparished areas in Greater Manchester
Geography of the Metropolitan Borough of Bolton